Virgil Melvin Hancher (September 4, 1896 – January 30, 1965) was the thirteenth President of the University of Iowa, serving from 1940 to 1964. Hancher Auditorium at the university was named for him.

Presidents of the University of Iowa
1896 births
1965 deaths
20th-century American academics